The 2018 NCAA Division II football season, part of college football in the United States organized by the National Collegiate Athletic Association (NCAA) at the Division II level, began on August 30, 2018, and ended with the Division II championship on December 15, 2018, at the McKinney Independent School District Stadium in McKinney, Texas, hosted by the Lone Star Conference.

Originally, the game was awarded to another bid by the Mid-America Intercollegiate Athletics Association and Children's Mercy Park in Kansas City, Kansas but, due to field repairs, that contract was terminated in September 2018.

Texas A&M–Commerce Lions were the defending champions from the previous season.

Headlines
 October 3 – Long Island University announced that it would merge its two current athletic programs—the LIU Brooklyn Blackbirds, full but non-football members of the Division I FCS Northeast Conference (NEC), and LIU Post Pioneers, full members of the Division II non-football East Coast Conference and football members of the Northeast-10 Conference—effective with the 2019–20 school year. The new program will compete under the LIU name with a new nickname, inheriting the Division I and NEC memberships of LIU Brooklyn. Following the athletic merger, the former Post football team will become the LIU football team, competing in the NEC as an FCS member.

Conference changes and new programs

Membership changes

Division II team wins over FCS teams
September 1:
Morehouse 34, Arkansas–Pine Bluff 30
September 22:
Truman State 34, Valparaiso 20

Conference standings

Super Region 1

Super Region 2

Super Region 3

Super Region 4

Playoffs

The 2018 NCAA Division II Football Championship was the 46th edition of the Division II playoffs. The playoffs began on November 17 and concluded with the championship game on December 15.

The field consisted of 28 teams, seven from each of the four super regions. The participants in each region were determined by the regional rankings; if a conference's highest-ranked team was ranked in the top nine, that team qualified via the "earned access" provision, and all other participants were selected directly from the rankings. The top seed in each region received a first-round bye. After the quarterfinals, the regional winners were reseeded one through four, with No. 1 meeting No. 4 in the semifinals and No. 2 meeting No. 3.

Participating teams

Bids by conference

Bracket

See also
2018 NCAA Division II football rankings
2018 NCAA Division I FBS football season
2018 NCAA Division I FCS football season
2018 NCAA Division III football season
2018 NAIA football season

References